Lenka Radová-Zemanová (born 9 October 1979 in Plzeň) is a triathlete from the Czech Republic, who competed at two Olympic games (2004 in Athens, and 2008 in Beijing). At the 2004 Summer Olympics, Radová-Zemanová finished in twenty-sixth place for the women's triathlon with a total time of 2:09:54. Meanwhile, at the 2008 Summer Olympics, Radová-Zemanová started out of the competition by maintaining her pace in the swimming leg of the women's event. Finishing in twenty-fourth place at both swimming and first transition phases, Radová-Zemanová had moved her way into a small group of competitors chasing the breakaways of the 40-km cycling race, until she crashed her bike and did not finish the race.

At the peak of her career, Radová-Zemanová took part in more than 50 ITU and ETU competitions, and had achieved twenty-nine top-ten finishes. Her best results happened in 2002, when she claimed two silver medals at the ITU World Triathlon Cup in Madeira, Portugal, and in Tiszaújváros, Hungary.

References

External links
 ITU Profile

1979 births
Living people
Czech female triathletes
Triathletes at the 2004 Summer Olympics
Triathletes at the 2008 Summer Olympics
Olympic triathletes of the Czech Republic
Sportspeople from Plzeň